Hilde Lyrån (born 2 January 1963 in the Grorud Valley, Oslo, Norway) is a Norwegian actress, dancer and comedian. She is best known for her roles as Trine in the Norwegian situation comedy Mot i brøstet and Karin in the comedy-drama Seks som oss.

Select filmography
2011, 2012– - Hotel Cæsar
2007 - Switch
2004 - Olsenbanden Jr. på rocker'n
2004 - Seks som oss (TV series)
2002 - Hilde & Brede show (TV series)
2000 - Vazelina Hjulkalender (TV series)
1995 - Mot i brøstet (TV series)

Dubbing roles
2010 - "Tangled" (2010) -Mother Gothel (Norwegian dub)

External links

1963 births
Living people
Norwegian television actresses
Norwegian voice actresses
Norwegian female dancers
Actresses from Oslo
Norwegian soap opera actresses
Norwegian women comedians